Glenn Aguiar McMillan (born October 5, 1984) is a Brazilian-Australian actor and lawyer best known internationally as Dustin, the Yellow Wind Ranger, on Power Rangers Ninja Storm. His father is Irish Australian and his mother is Brazilian.

Biography
McMillan was born in São João da Boa Vista, Brazil and was raised in Adelaide, South Australia, Australia from the age of three. He remains close to his Brazilian heritage, speaks fluent Portuguese and revisits his place of birth often.

Glenn holds a Bachelor of Laws with Honours from the University of Adelaide Law School, one semester of which he took on exchange at Pace University School of Law, New York. He also holds a Graduate Diploma of Legal Practice and a Master of Laws Majoring in Commercial Litigation from the College of Law, Sydney. He is admitted as a lawyer in Australia, England and Wales.

McMillan is a property sales consultant with TOOP+TOOP Real Estate in Hyde Park, Adelaide.

Career

Acting career
McMillan's first professional acting role was at age 11 in a State Theatre Company of South Australia production of Six Characters in Search of an Author, by Luigi Pirandello, playing the role of the "Young Boy". In 1998, he played "Ben Handleman" in his first feature film, Sally Marshall Is Not an Alien, followed by the role of "Tiny Maloney" in the television series 'Chuck Finn' for Seven Network in 1999. He has performed in numerous theatre productions, including the role of "Jack" in Into the Woods by James Lapine and Stephen Sondheim, and "Vyasa" in the Mahabharata. From 2002–2003, McMillan played the role of "Dustin Brooks" in Power Rangers Ninja Storm, filmed in New Zealand, then "Bronley Hale" in Zenon: Z3 for Disney Channel, shot on location in South Africa, and Power Rangers Dino Thunder. In 2012, McMillan appeared in the feature film Swerve, followed by the role of "Adauto Agallo" in the award-winning miniseries Mrs Biggs. From 2013 to 2015 he filmed the Australian television drama Wonderland for Network Ten, in which he played "Carlos dos Santos".

Personal life
In 2016, he married Julia Alonso, a Brazilian doctor.

He trains Brazilian jiu-jitsu and received his blue belt from multiple world champion, Roger Gracie, and his purple belt from Fabio Gurgel. He trains at Alliance Sydney.
 
During the start of COVID-19 quarantine, his wife gave birth to a child.

Filmography

References

1984 births
Australian male film actors
Australian male television actors
Australian people of Brazilian descent
Australian people of German descent
Australian people of Irish descent
Australian practitioners of Brazilian jiu-jitsu
Brazilian people of Australian descent
Brazilian people of German descent
Brazilian people of Irish descent
Brazilian emigrants to Australia
Living people
Male actors from São Paulo (state)
Pace University School of Law alumni
People educated at Pembroke School, Adelaide
Adelaide Law School alumni
20th-century Australian male actors
21st-century Australian male actors
People from São João da Boa Vista